Kayvan Novak (born 23 November 1977) is a British-Iranian actor and comedian. He co-created and starred in the comedy series Fonejacker from 2006 to 2008 with a one-off in 2012, winning the BAFTA Television Award for Best Comedy (Programme or Series) in 2008.

He also portrayed Waj in the 2010 comedy film Four Lions, and he plays the vampire Nandor the Relentless in the mockumentary series What We Do in the Shadows.

Early life
Novak was born in London to Iranian parents. He was privately educated at Highgate School and the Fine Arts College in Hampstead, before attending the Webber Douglas Academy of Dramatic Art.

Career 
Novak initially appeared on various British shows, including Family Affairs, Holby City, and Spooks. In 2005, he and Ed Tracy created Fonejacker, a prank call show as part of Channel 4's Comedy Lab strand. After the pilot, he was given a Christmas special and a six-part series, which began airing on 5 July 2007 on E4; and 7 September 2007 on Channel 4. In November 2009, he appeared on the Channel 4 show The Increasingly Poor Decisions of Todd Margaret, playing a bomb-disposal officer. In April 2010, Novak began appearing in a spin-off of Fonejacker called Facejacker, in which he adopted various disguises, including several characters heard in Fonejacker. Novak announced on BBC Radio 1 in May 2012 that the character Terry Tibbs, a mainstay of both shows, would be getting a spin-off chat show; this aired in August 2012. Novak played Simon in the Channel 4 sitcom pilot Bad Sugar.

Novak filmed a scene for This Is England '86 which was cut from the final broadcast, but appears in the DVD extras. He was also one of the main characters in the television show Sirens, which began on 27 June 2011 on Channel 4 in the UK. Novak also featured in two episodes of Phone Shop, the first in Series 1, titled "The First Temptation of Chris", and the second in Series 2, titled "Revenge of the Razz". He played area manager Razz Prince. In addition to acting, Novak has made appearances as himself on shows Soccer AM, 8 out of 10 Cats, Celebrity Big Brother's Little Brother, and Never Mind the Buzzcocks.

Novak appeared as an intelligence officer in the Academy Award-winning film Syriana. In 2008, he appeared in micro-budget B-movie The Blue Tower. He also appeared in the 2010 comedy Four Lions, in which he played the dim-witted Waj, a role for which he won the award for Best Comedy Performance in a British Film at the 2010 British Comedy Awards, beating fellow actor Nigel Lindsay, who was nominated for his role in the same film. 

Novak appeared as Alok in the first series of BBC Radio 4 comedy Fags, Mags and Bags. He has provided voice work for three video games: Wallace & Gromit: The Curse of the Were-Rabbit, Perfect Dark Zero and Kameo. He also voiced various characters in the ITV spoof sketch show Headcases, and in the 2012 Channel 4 animated series Full English. He lent his vocals to British band Beady Eye's 2013 song "Flick of the Finger".

In 2013, he appeared as Effy Stonem's boss in the Skins episode "Skins Fire". He voiced a Cyberman head called Handles in the Doctor Who 2013 Christmas special "The Time of the Doctor". He had a starring role in the last episode of the first series of Uncle as Mo, the boss of a fictional record label. In 2014, he played Paul in the second episode ("A Quiet Night In") of Inside No. 9. Also in 2014, he appeared in Episode 1, Series 3 of Rev. as the Imam, Yussef Hasan. 

Since 2015, he has voiced the character of Brains in the revived ITV series Thunderbirds Are Go. In 2015, he featured in the sitcom Asylum as "Rafael". In May 2015, he appeared in a new comedy series called SunTrap on BBC1. In May 2017, Novak appeared in Channel 4's Britain Today, Tonight.

In 2019, Novak was cast as the vampire Nandor The Relentless in the mockumentary comedy horror television series What We Do In The Shadows. The show is based on the 2014 film of the same name.

Novak speaks fluent Persian, as seen on the second episode of Season 2 (“Ghosts”) of What We Do in the Shadows.

In 2021, he released eight episodes of "All New Fonejacker Podcast" on Audible and starred as Roger in Disney's Cruella.

Personal life
Novak is a fan of Liverpool FC.

Filmography

Film

Television

Video games

References

External links

1978 births
Living people
21st-century English male actors
Comedians from London
English male comedians
English male film actors
English male television actors
English male video game actors
English male voice actors
English people of Iranian descent
Male actors from London
People educated at Highgate School
People from Cricklewood
Prank calling